Parrivaar - Kartavya Ki Pariksha is a Hindi serial that aired on Zee TV channel from 9 April 2007 until 5 December 2008.

Plot 
The show is based on the story of a middle-class girl Radha, who goes through the hardships of survival, education, and employment to support her poor family.  Since the father has abandoned them (died), Radha has taken upon the responsibility of supporting her family and the education of her two younger siblings.  She, in fact, is the only earning member and her immediate brother, though married lives off her earnings.  The family, conditioned to this does not want her to get married and go away as that will mean that their support system is going away. Her neighborhood childhood friend, Mohit is her only source of support and there are possibilities of them get married if he can fulfill her mother’s conditions of making at least Rs. 25,000 {$461} per month. The dilemma is: Will Radha ever find her man in life and will she ever abandon her family?

Cast 
 Deepti Shrikant as Radha Joshi / Radha Adhiraj Shergill / Radha Shlok Nerulkar
 Sachin Sharma as Shlok Nerulkar
 Neena Cheema as Mrs. Joshi (Aaji)
 Alka Ashlesha as Jaya Joshi (Aai)
 Ashish Kapoor / Mohit Sharma as Avinash Joshi
 Shweta Shinde as Meghna Avinash Joshi
 Sonali Verma as Mandira Avinash Joshi
 Ankita Srivastava as Ankita Joshi
 Parth Mehrotra as Yash Joshi
 Kapil Soni as Mohit
 Harsh Vashisht as Pranay Kumar
 Payal Nair as Ishita Chhabra / Ishita Pranay Kumar
 Amit Singh Thakur as Mr. Chhabra 
 Melissa Pais as Sajni 
 Karan Singh Grover / Rahil Azam as Adhiraj (Addy) Shergill
 Diwakar Pundir as Shaurya Shergill 
 Sonia Kapoor as Sangamitra Shergill 
 Mamta Dutta as Mallishka 
 Gunjan Walia as Dr. Radha Swapnil Nerulkar
 Faisal Raza Khan as Swapnil Nerulkar
 Sulabha Arya as Pratibha Nerulkar (Dadi) 
 Uday Tikekar as Shivaji Rao Nerulkar 
 Sahiba Khan as Sumita Shivaji Rao Nerulkar 
 Sonika Sahay as Parminder (Pammi) Sandeep Nerulkar 
 Amit Sareen as Malik Chaturvedi
 Apara Mehta as Manorama Nerulkar 
 Neetha Shetty as Urvashi Swapnil Nerulkar 
 Jyoti Makker as Sophia
 Yajuvendra Singh as Sandeep Nerulkar 
 Karishma Randhawa as Aarti
 Pallavi Subhash Chandran
 Garima Vikrant Singh
 Ashwini Kalsekar
 Krip Suri
 Tarul Swami
 Mandar Chandwadkar
[Aartii Kandpal as chinkki]

References

External links
Official Website

2007 Indian television series debuts
2008 Indian television series endings
Indian television soap operas
Zee TV original programming